This is a list of the most common surnames in Europe, sorted by country.

Albania 

At the moment, listings for the most common names are unavailable for Albania. However the most common names include the following:

 Common names denoting profession. Of these, religious professional names have been particularly widespread, including Hoxha (a Muslim priest, Sunni or Bektashi, with its variant Hoxhaj), Prifti (a Christian priest, Catholic or Orthodox), Shehu (a Bektashi priest) and Dervishi (Bektashi clergy). Bektashi itself is also a common surname. Ironically, Hoxha was the surname of Enver Hoxha, the leader of Communist Albania who banned all religions. There are numerous other professional names which are not as common. Begu also denotes a former ruler and also the surname(s) Gjoni or Gjonaj.
 Common names which originated as patrinomials. Common names of this sort include Leka or Lekaj (Alex), Gjoni or Gjonaj (John), Murati (Murad), Mehmeti (Mehmed), Hysi (typically short for Hussein), Gjika/Gjoka (short for Jacob, cf Jake), Marku (Mark), Kola/Kolla/Nikolla (Nicholas), Hasani (Hassan), Kristi/Kristo, Luka (Lucas), Brahimi (Abraham, from Turkish), Sinani, Thanasi (Athanasius), Halili (Halil), and Abazi (Abbas). Albanians of Muslim background often bear Christian last names (denoting former Christian origin), and those with Christian often bear Muslim last names (which many in Northern regions adopted thinking it would lead to better treatment from the Ottoman authorities), although the holders of Bektashi surnames are usually actually of Bektashi background
 Common names which originated as place names. May denote former residence, or, if the bearer has a Muslim patrilineal background, that their ancestors ruled the place. Common places used as surnames include Dibra, Laci, Shkodra, Prishtina, Delvina, Koroveshi and Permeti, as well as the famous Frasheri surname of the Frasheri family. Additionally common some names indicate regional origins: Gega/Gegaj (for one of Gheg origin), Tosku/Toskaj (signifying Tosk origin) and Chami (for Cham origin).
 Some common names are Northern Albanian clan names that double as place names such as Kelmendi and Shkreli. Other notable clan-origin names include Berisha, Krasniqi and Gashi. These sorts of names are very common in far Northern Albania and in Kosovo.
 Colors: of which Kuqi (red) and Bardhi (white) are the most commonly used as surnames.

Armenia
Source: Armenia’s Voter List

Austria 

The forty-one most common surnames in Austria as published in 2006 are shown below beside the approximate percentage of the Austrian population sharing each surname.

Azerbaijan

Belarus 
Statistics available for the Belarusian capital of Minsk only:

Belgium 

Belgium is a European nation composed of three main regions: Flemish Region (Flanders), Walloon Region (Wallonia), and Brussels-Capital Region. Flanders has a Dutch-language tradition, while Wallonia has a French-language tradition. The Brussels-Capital Region is a mix of both Dutch- and French-language influences, with a large influx of foreign names. These different linguistic backgrounds are reflected in differing frequencies of surnames, as shown in the table below. On 31 December 1997 there were 316 295 different surnames in Belgium (total population: 11,521,238).

 Note — the following table contains the ten most common surnames in each of the three federal regions as of 1 January 2021.

Bosnia and Herzegovina

Bosniaks

Serbs 

The following names are the most common names for Serbs from Bosnia and Herzegovina.

Bulgaria 

Feminized names included (m. Dimitrov – f. Dimitrova). Figures are from 2018 and provided by the Bulgarian National Statistics Institute.

Croatia

Czechia 
Feminized names are included (m. Novák/f. Nováková). Figures are from 2009 and provided by the Czech Ministry of the Interior.

Denmark 
Nineteen of the twenty most common Danish surnames as of 1 January 2022 are patronymic ending in Norse -sen ('son of'), the only exception being Møller (Miller).

Faroe Islands 
The 20 most common surnames in the Faroe Islands as published in 2017 are shown below beside the number of people of the Faroese population sharing each surname.

{|
|-
| valign="top"|

Estonia 
Data from 2008.

Names of Estonian origin:

Names of Russian origin:

Finland 

Most of the names on this list are typical examples of surnames that were adopted when modern surnames were introduced in the late 19th and early 20th centuries. In the romantic spirit, they refer to natural features:  'river',  'rapids',  'hill',  'lake',  'island' — often with the suffix -nen added after the model of older, mainly eastern Finnish surnames such as Korhonen and Heikkinen. Hämäläinen literally means 'an inhabitant of Häme'. The suffix -nen is an adjective ending.

Most common Swedish surnames in Finland

France

Georgia

Germany

Greece 

The majority of Greek names are patronymic. There are also several names derived from professions (Samaras,  'saddle maker', Papoutsis,  'shoe maker'), area of (former) residence (Kritikos,  'from Crete', Aivaliotis,  'from Ayvalık'), nicknames relating to physical or other characteristics (Kontos,  'short', Mytaras,  'large-nosed', Koufos,  'deaf') and more.

The patronymic suffix varies between dialects; thus Giannidis, Giannakos, Giannatos, Giannopoulos, Giannelis, Giannioglou all mean 'son of Giannis'.

Hungary 

As of 2011, 2,095,788 individuals (21% of the population) bear the most common 20 names, and 3,347,493 individuals (33.5%) bearing the top 100 names. 25 most common surnames in Hungary as of January 2019:

Iceland 

While the vast majority of Icelanders do not use regular surnames but rather patronyms or matronyms, around 4% of Icelanders have proper surnames. See also Icelandic names.

The 20 most common surnames in the Iceland as published in 2017 are shown below beside the number of people of the Icelandic population sharing each surname.

{|
|-
| valign="top"|

Ireland 

The prevalence of some of these names is the result of more than one distinct Irish language names being represented by the same anglicised version.

Names starting with O' and Mac/Mc were originally patronymic. Of the names above, with the exception of Smith and Walsh, all originally began with O' or Mac/Mc but many have lost this prefix over time. Mac/Mc, meaning Son, and Ó, meaning Little (or Descendant), are used by sons born into the family. In the case of a daughter being born into the family she would use Ní/Nic, for example Ó Muireadhaigh becomes Ní Mhuireadhaigh. A woman who marries into the family and takes her husband's name uses Uí/Mic- e.g. Uí Mhuireadhaigh.

Italy 

From Mappa dei Cognomi website.

Kosovo 

These statistics are based on the Kosovo Agency of Statistics report on names and surnames in Kosovo, which took place in 2017.

Latvia 

 Latvian surnames

Lithuania

Luxembourg 

Out of 236,000 entries in the EDITUS phone book:

Malta

Moldova

Montenegro

Netherlands 

The most recent complete count of surnames in the Netherlands is based on the September 2007 county registrations.

When closely related names are combined, the top 15 are:

* "vd" is an abbreviation which stands for all variants of "van de", "van den", or "van der"

Source: Nederlands Repertorium van Familienamen, Meertens-Instituut, 1963–2009. Data can be viewed in the Corpus of Family Names in the Netherlands
See specifically De top 100 van de familienamen in Nederland (Dutch) 

Names ending in -stra or -ma are usually of Frisian origin. For example, Terpstra, Bijlsma, Halsema.

Names ending in -ink or -ing are usually of Low Saxon origin. For example, Hiddink, Meyerink, Mentink.

North Macedonia

Norway

Poland 

Polish names which end with -ski or -cki have both male and female forms – Kamiński/Kamińska, Wielicki/Wielicka, etc. This needs to be considered when taking a count by, for instance, scanning a telephone book.  Historically, -ski, cognate with English -ish and French -esque, was a particle of nobility, like German von.

Portugal 

The 50 most frequent surnames in Portugal are listed below. Those elements are not part of the surname and are not considered in an alphabetical order.

Romania

Russia 

 See also: Список общерусских фамилий (in Russian Wikipedia)

The 20 most common widespread Russian surnames (for males) from the European part of Russia, as calculated by Balanovskaya et al. (2005):

Those Russian surnames that end with -ov/-ev or -in/-yn are originally patronymic or metronymic possessive adjectivals with the meaning 'son of' or 'daughter/wife of' (the feminine is formed with the -a ending – Smirnova, Ivanova, etc.). In older documents such surnames were written with the word syn 'son', for example, Ivánov syn 'John's son' or Il'yín syn 'Elijah's son'; the last word was later dropped. Such names are roughly equivalent to the English or Welsh surnames Richardson or Richards.

The Russian equivalent of 'Smith', 'Jones', and 'Brown' (that is, the generic most often used surnames) are Ivanov, Petrov, Sidorov, or 'Johns', 'Peters', and 'Isidores', although Sidorov is now ranked only 66th.

Serbia

Slovakia 

Note: The most common surnames in Slovakia are a mixture of Indo-European and the Ugric roots reflecting the 900-year-long coexistence of the Indo-European Slovaks and speakers of other Indo-European languages with Ugric Hungarians and the Croatians, under Hungarian assimilation pressure throughout the 19th century (see Magyarization, see History of Slovakia). In 1910 Hungarians made up one-third of the population of the present-day territory of Slovakia. Hungarians are currently an 8% minority in Slovakia. (see Demographics of Slovakia). While ethnic Hungarians are relatively few in Slovakia, their large presence on the list of most common names reflects the intra-lingual frequency of the frequent names in Hungary.

Slovenia

Spain 

The top ten surnames cover about 20% of the population, with important geographical differences. The regional distribution of surnames within Spain was homogenized mostly through internal migrations, especially since 1950. Names typical of the old crown of Castile have become the most common all over the country. Most of the common Spanish patronymic surnames were introduced in Spain during the fifth to seventh centuries by the Visigoths.

Source: – Data from December 1999. (2004 data confirmation of top 25)

Canary Islands

Sweden 
Source: World Family Names

List of the 10 most common names among the Sami people (compiled from one third of the Sametinget voting list 2005):

Switzerland 
German-speaking cantons (1998):
Source:

Surnames of the Italian-speaking canton of Ticino

Turkey 

Source: Turkish General Directorate of Population and Citizenships

Ukraine 

Many of the surnames use the same root but different suffixes, or even different roots of the same meaning, depending on the part of Ukraine the person hails from.

United Kingdom

England

Greater London 
The following list is for Greater London.

Northern Ireland 
Source:

Scotland 
Source:

Wales 
Source:

See also 

 List of family name affixes
 List of most popular given names
 Lists of most common surnames, for other continents

Notes

References 

Europe
Surnames, most common
Surnames